Stuyvesant Fish Morris (August 3, 1843 – May 10, 1928) was an American physician and the progenitor of Manhattan's prominent family of physicians.

Early life
Morris was born in Manhattan on August 3, 1843.  He was a son of Richard Lewis Morris (1805–1880) and Elizabeth Sarah Fish (1810–1881). His siblings included Richard Lewis Morris Jr., Elizabeth Stuyvesant Morris, and James Morris.

His maternal grandparents were Nicholas Fish (1758–1833), Adjutant General of New York and Revolutionary War soldier, and Elizabeth (née Stuyvesant) Fish (1775–1854), a descendant of both the Livingston family and Peter Stuyvesant, the last Dutch director-general of New Amsterdam.  He was also a nephew of Hamilton Fish, the Governor of New York, U.S. Senator, and U.S. Secretary of State.  His paternal grandparents were Helen (née Van Cortlandt) Morris (1768–1812) and James Morris (1764–1827), High Sheriff of New York.  His grandfather was a son of Lewis Morris (1726–1798), signor of the Declaration of Independence, from the prominent Colonial-era Morris family of the Morrisania section of the Bronx.

Education and training
Morris was educated at Columbia College Grammar School.  He graduated from Columbia University in 1863, earning an A.B. degree, and in 1866, earning an A.M. degree.  He earned his medical degree from Columbia Medical School in 1867.  He trained as the acting Assistant Surgeon, United States, house surgeon for the New York Hospital, and as a sanitary inspector.

Career
During the U.S. Civil War, Morris enlisted as a private in the Union Army, Company K, 7th Infantry, New York Regiment on June 1, 1862 and he mustered out on September 5, 1862.  The regiment was known as a "Silk Stocking" regiment and "Blue-Bloods" due to the disproportionate number of its members who were part of New York City's social elite,  In 1864, he was acting Medical Cadet at Sand's Island and in 1866, he served as acting Assistant Surgeon at Hart and Davids Island during the fourth cholera pandemic.
 
Morris practiced medicine in New York City for more than 40 years.  His office was located at 16 East 30th Street in Manhattan.  Dr. Morris was published in The New York Times, the New York Medical Journal and the Brooklyn Medical Journal.

He retired in 1913, and in 1920 was living at 16 East 30th Street in Manhattan.  Dr. Morris was a member of the Century Club and the Saint Nicholas Society.  He also served as a member of the board of trustees of the Parochial Fund of the Protestant Episcopal Church in the Diocese of New York.

Personal life
On December 10, 1868, he married Ellen James "Elly" Van Buren (1844–1929) at Saint Mark's Church in New York City. Elly's paternal grandfather was the 8th U.S. President Martin Van Buren (1782-1862).  They owned a house located in Quogue (a village within Southampton, New York) at the SE corner of Quogue Street and Post Lane, where he was president of the Quogue Field Golf Club.  Together, they were the parents of the six children:

 Elizabeth Marshall Morris (1869–1919) who made her debut in 1888. She married Benjamin Woolsey Rogers in 1906.
 Van Buren Morris (1871–1872), who died young.
 Ellen Van Buren Morris (1873–1954) who married Francis Livingston Pell (1873–1945), a descendant of James Duane, in 1899.
 Stuyvesant Morris, who also died young.
 Richard Lewis Morris III (1875–1954), who married Carolyn Whitney Fellowes (b. 1882), a daughter of Cornelius Fellowes, in 1908.
 Stuyvesant Fish Morris Jr. (1877–1925), a stock broker who married Elizabeth Hillis Wynkoop (1878–1930), daughter of Dr. Gerardus Hilles Wynkoop, in 1900.  They were the parents of Stuyvesant Fish Morris III (d. 1948).

Morris died at his residence, 116 East 58th Street in Manhattan, on May 10, 1928.  His funeral was held at Calvary Church in New York City and was buried at Quogue Cemetery.

Writings about Morris family
Jeffrey Thomas writes:
In 1864 Henry James wrote of [Ellen Van Buren] in a letter, 'Miss Ellen Van Buren is here -- pale, thin, and drooping. We taunt her facetiously with being in love ... whereat she smiles languidly.' Four years later Henry James commented in a letter to William James, 'We heard from Elly Van Buren that she is engaged to one Dr. Morris of New Rochelle, a young physician who has cared for her for 4 years and never has been attentive to any girl in the interval. I should think Elly's own conscience should sting her.' About this time Alice James remarked acidly that Elly's flustered carryings - on about her engagement were likely to exasperate her fiancé beyond endurance. In 1913, Henry, writing to his acolyte Howard Sturgis about the relatives he had mentioned in his memoir A Small Boy and Others, explained enigmatically, 'Yes, my Father's two other sisters were my Van Buren and my Temple aunts. I should have liked to drag in the former's daughter, the intimate of our childhood, or of mine, later Mrs. Stuyvesant Morris, but forebore.' In January 1902 William James wrote to Henry during a visit to the United States, 'I also saw Elly Van Buren, old looking but unaltered in manner.'

Philanthropy
In 1907, Morris donated 860 letters addressed to President Van Buren, printed circulars and broadsides, 1,700 other letters and political items to the Library of Congress.  His donation, along with that of Mrs. Smith Thompson Van Buren, his mother-in-law, rendered the Library "a remarkably full one of political documents bearing upon the middle period [as of 1907] of the history of the United States."

References

External links

1843 births
1928 deaths
Columbia Grammar & Preparatory School alumni
Columbia University alumni
Columbia University Vagelos College of Physicians and Surgeons alumni
Stuyvesant Fish Morris
People from Manhattan
Physicians from New York City
Stuyvesant Fish Morris